West Virginia's 14th Senate district is one of 17 districts in the West Virginia Senate. It is currently represented by Republicans David Sypolt and Randy Smith. All districts in the West Virginia Senate elect two members to staggered four-year terms.

Geography
District 14 is located at the base of the state's Eastern Panhandle, covering all of Barbour, Hardy, Preston, Taylor, and Tucker Counties, as well as parts of Grant, Mineral, and Monongalia Counties. Communities within the district include Philippi, Belington, Grafton, Brookhaven, Kingwood, Terra Alta, Parsons, Keyser, and Moorefield.

The district is largely within West Virginia's 1st congressional district, with a small portion extending into the 2nd district. It overlaps with the 47th, 48th, 49th, 51st, 52nd, 53rd, 54th, 55th, and 56th districts of the West Virginia House of Delegates. It borders the states of Pennsylvania, Maryland, and Virginia.

Recent election results

2022

Historical election results

2020

2018

2016

2014

2012

Federal and statewide results in District 14

References

14
Barbour County, West Virginia
Grant County, West Virginia
Hardy County, West Virginia
Mineral County, West Virginia
Monongalia County, West Virginia
Preston County, West Virginia
Taylor County, West Virginia
Tucker County, West Virginia